Cosens & Co Ltd was a British excursion steamer and marine engineering company based in Weymouth.

History

The company was founded in 1848 by Joseph Cosens and incorporated in 1876. It operated a fleet of paddle steamers on excursions along the south coast of England and on cross channel trips to Cherbourg and Alderney. It also operated a number of launches offering "trips round the bay" as well as tugs serving ships using Weymouth harbour. Up to the end of World War I the company held the Admiralty contract to operate liberty boats for naval ships at Portland. The engineering side of the company was a major ship repair and marine engineering facility. The company also had a cold storage and ice-making facility adjacent to the port.

In 1851 Joseph Cosens was operating the steamer Princess between Weymouth and Portland, when he found that a rival organisation, the Weymouth & Portland Steam Packet Company, owned by Philip Dodson, intended placing its own steamer Contractor on the same route. Cosens' response to this was to expand the company by going into partnership with wealthy local newspaper proprietor, Joseph Drew, in order to obtain a new ship. The new ship, named Prince, was designed and built by John Scott Russell, famous later as the builder of the ill-fated .

Joseph Cosens died at the end of 1873 and Joseph Drew became chairman.

In 1946 Cosens was taken over by its Southampton based rival Red Funnel which continued to operate the pleasure steamers, in conjunction with its own, until 1966 when the last surviving paddle steamer was withdrawn from service. The engineering division continued however, finally being sold in a management buy-out in 1990. Renamed Cosens Engineering Ltd it had a brief independent career that ended in receivership.

Fleet

Cosens' archive collection is extensive, and available to view at the Dorset history Centre, Dorchester
https://archive-catalogue.dorsetcouncil.gov.uk/

References

Bibliography

External links

Defunct shipping companies of the United Kingdom